Gennadiy (Zvi Hirsch) Bogolyubov (born 20 January 1962) is a Ukrainian billionaire businessman based in the United Kingdom. He controls Privat Group, along with Ihor Kolomoyskyi and Oleksiy Martynov.

Early life
Gennadiy Bogolyubov is a native of Dniprodzerzhynsk, Dnipropetrovsk Oblast.

Career
In 2010, Bogolyubov was reported as being the third richest Ukrainian, having a net worth of $5.429 billion.

He has interests in ferroalloys, petrochemicals, and finance, and owns the largest manganese miner in Australia, Consolidated Minerals.

In April 2015, it was reported that he had settled out of court with his rabbi, Yonah Pruss, who had sought over £20 million, over "two major London property deals".

Bogolyubov and fellow Ukrainian billionaire Igor Kolomoisky are being sued by another Ukrainian billionaire Viktor Pinchuk in the largest damages claim before London's High Court, for about US$2 billion.

Philanthropy
Bogolyubov has established the Bogolyubov Foundation, "a charitable organisation rooted in authentic Torah values". In 2014, his foundation funded an educational center for Jewish history in a hall excavated under Jerusalem's Muslim Quarter, among mainly Mamluk remains connected by underground spaces to the Western Wall tunnel. Bogolyubov financed the excavation and refurbishing of the underground area with ca. $20 million out of his own wealth. Bogolyubov funded the Menorah Centre, a 56,000 square meter Jewish community center with attached synagogue in Dnepropetrovsk, Ukraine.

Personal life
Bogolyubov is married with six children. He resides on Belgrave Square in Belgravia, London, England. He led a secular life until his mid-40s when he rediscovered Judaism and is a practicing Jew today.

It was reported in The Guardian that Bogolyubov had acquired Cypriot citizenship in 2016 through a "Golden visa" scheme, "as a result of him having made substantial investments in the country (via certain companies) and being fully compliant with the legal requirements at the time".

In November 2017 Bogolyubov officially declared that he was a citizen of Ukraine, United Kingdom, Israel and Cyprus. He also noted that he lives in Geneva, Switzerland.

References

1962 births
Living people
Ukrainian oligarchs
People from Kamianske
Ukrainian billionaires
Ukrainian philanthropists
Ukrainian Jews
Cypriot billionaires
Ukrainian emigrants to Cyprus
Naturalized citizens of Cyprus
Ukrainian businesspeople in the United Kingdom